Sulfaguanidine is a sulfonamide.

Sulfaguanidine is a guanidine derivative of sulfanilamide used in veterinary medicine. Sulfaguanidine is poorly absorbed from the gut but is well suited for the treatment of bacillary dysentery and other enteric infections.

Sulphaguanidine (II) was independently prepared by Marshall, Bratton, White, and Litchfield and Roblin, Williams, Winnek, and English in 1940, and introduced for the treatment of bacillary dysentery on the basis of its poor absorption from the gut. Its orally administered route of administration is now well established.

References 

Guanidines
Sulfonamide antibiotics